North Washington Street Historic District is a national historic district located in the city of Bloomington of Monroe County, Indiana. The district encompasses 35 contributing buildings and 6 contributing structures in a predominantly residential section of Bloomington. It developed between roughly 1870 and 1929, and includes notable examples of Queen Anne, Classical Revival, and Bungalow/American Craftsman style architecture. Located in the district is the separately listed Morgan House. Other notable buildings include the Showers-Graham House (c. 1905), Showers-Myers House (c. 1900), Teter House (c. 1913), and Washington Terrace Apartments (1929).

It was listed on the National Register of Historic Places in 1991.

References

Historic districts on the National Register of Historic Places in Indiana
Bungalow architecture in Indiana
Queen Anne architecture in Indiana
Neoclassical architecture in Indiana
Buildings and structures in Bloomington, Indiana
Historic districts in Monroe County, Indiana
National Register of Historic Places in Monroe County, Indiana